The following lists events that happened during 1998 in Sri Lanka.

Incumbents
President: Chandrika Kumaratunga
Prime Minister: Sirimavo Bandaranaike
Chief Justice: G. P. S. de Silva

Governors
 Central Province – E. L. Senanayake (until 1998); Stanley Tillekeratne (starting 1998)
 North Central Province – Maithripala Senanayake (until 12 July); G. M. S. Samaraweera (starting 12 July)
 North Eastern Province – Gamini Fonseka (until 20 October); Asoka Jayawardena (starting 20 October)
 North Western Province – Hector Arawwawala 
 Sabaragamuwa Province – C. N. Saliya Mathew 
 Southern Province – Neville Kanakeratne 
 Uva Province – Ananda Dassanayake 
 Western Province – K. Vignarajah

Chief Ministers
 Central Province – W. M. P. B. Dissanayake (until 1998); vacant (starting 1998)
 North Central Province – Jayasena Dissanayake (until June); vacant (starting June)
 North Western Province – Nimal Bandara 
 Sabaragamuwa Province – Jayatilake Podinilame (until June); Vacant (starting June)
 Southern Province – Mahinda Yapa Abeywardena 
 Uva Province – Percy Samaraweera (until June); vacant (starting June)
 Western Province – Susil Premajayanth (until June); vacant (starting June)

Events
 Bolstered by successes in 1997, the Liberation Tigers of Tamil Eelam unleash phase 2 of Operation Unceasing Waves in September 1998. The LTTE captures the town of Killinochi in the North East, but lose Mankulam to the Sri Lankan Army.
 Local government elections were held in Sri Lanka on 29 January 1998 for 17 local authorities on the Jaffna peninsula, in the north of the country.

Notes 

a.  Gunaratna, Rohan. (1998). Pg.353, Sri Lanka's Ethnic Crisis and National Security, Colombo: South Asian Network on Conflict Research.

References